The Equatorial Stars is the third studio album by British ambient duo Robert Fripp and Brian Eno. The album was released in 2004, which marked almost 30 years since the two musicians had collaborated on their second album, Evening Star, in 1975.

Track listing
All songs by Brian Eno and Robert Fripp.
"Meissa" – 8:08
"Lyra" – 7:45
"Tarazed" – 5:03
"Lupus" – 5:09
"Ankaa" – 7:01
"Altair" – 5:11
"Terebellum" – 9:40

References

Brian Eno albums
Robert Fripp albums
2004 albums
Discipline Global Mobile albums
Collaborative albums